The Breeze (callsign: 4BRZ) is a Soft Adult Contemporary and classic hits formatted radio station, based in the Gold Coast suburb of Helensvale, Queensland, and broadcasting across regional and rural areas of Queensland and New South Wales. First broadcast in 2003, it is owned and operated by Rebel Media, which also operates Rebel FM.

Breeze Frequencies

New South Wales
 97.7 FM Gloucester
 102.5 FM Tenterfield

Queensland

 89.7 FM Biloela
 88.9 FM Canungra
 95.5 FM Chinchilla
 90.1 FM Collinsville
 92.1 FM Cooktown
 100.6 FM Gold Coast
 98.7 FM Goondiwindi
 92.1 FM Logan & Beaudesert
 103.3 FM Kooralbyn
 101.3 FM Miles
 100.5 FM Monto
 104.5 FM Richmond
 90.1 FM Stanthorpe
 94.1 FM Taroom
 99.5 FM Theodore
 97.7 FM Weipa
 102.5 FM Wide Bay (Bundaberg / Maryborough)

References

Classic hits radio stations in Australia
Oldies radio stations in Australia
Radio stations established in 2003
Radio stations on the Gold Coast, Queensland
Radio stations in Queensland
Radio stations in New South Wales